Opportunities Industrialization Center (usually shortened to “OIC” and doing business as OIC of America, Inc. and OIC International, Inc.) is a nonprofit adult education and job training organization headquartered in Philadelphia, Pennsylvania, with offices located in New Haven, CT, Washington, D.C. and Burma Camp, Accra, Ghana.

Founded in 1964, OIC operates 38 affiliated centers in 22  states in the US and 20 international centers in Africa, Haiti and Poland, according to its website. These are designed to provide General Education Development studies and workforce development courses focused on helping economically disadvantaged persons, minority communities, and adults and adolescents seeking to complete or resume their education and obtain employment.

Renee Cardwell Hughes became CEO of OIC in January 2020, succeeding Dr. Kevin R. Johnson. Leon Sullivan was OIC's founder.

Programs
As of 2018, OIC website stated it operated "over 30 affiliated centers, 22 in the US and 20 international centers in Africa, Haiti and Poland". A November 1999 article in the New York Times stated it operated "70 branches nationwide and 46 in 18 other countries."
The 2021 website of OIC America listed five programs:
Vocational training -- "a core element of OIC's mission"; for both unemployed and those who have a job and want a better one; "helps lower-skilled workers learn new skills and earn industry-recognized credentials".
Work readiness -- "effective communication, problem solving, resume building, interviewing, and job search skills".
SOAR (skills and opportunities for achievement and responsibility) program to reintegrate into society people released from prison and prevent recidivism. Provides "relationship development to intensive case management, academic support, vocational training and credentialing, job placement, and long-term follow-up services". A "structured, yet holistic approach".
Education—offers "adult basic education, GED preparation and/or testing services" for students such as " over-age, under-credentialed students" who never got a high school diploma but need GED for a job or further training.
Youth development -- "engaging" youth "to recognize, utilize, and enhance their strengths."
Healthcare—OIC offers vocational training in employment areas such as certified nursing assistant, but also offers "comprehensive, affordable, healthcare".

Its schools/facilities usually have OIC in the name, such as "Summit Academy OIC", "American Indian OIC".

History

Origins
OIC was founded on 1964, by Leon Sullivan, a civil rights leader and pastor of the Zion Baptist Church in Philadelphia with an education and job training facility to help African Americans. Its first facility was a converted former jailhouse on 19th and Oxford Streets in North Philadelphia. The program was developed to provide job training and instruction in life skills to disadvantaged and disenfranchised peoples with few prospects, and helped place participants into the workforce. Sullivan discovered that thousands of African Americans and other Philadelphia residents in lower-income communities were unemployed, despite a surplus in job vacancies during that time. This led to the launch of a "selective patronage" campaign, i.e. a boycott against Philadelphia-area companies that were not practicing equal opportunity in employment.

Expansion
Renovations to the dilapidated building were funded through donations from community organizers and citizens, and through a grant given by an anonymous donor. The programs provided by the Philadelphia center were replicated in other American cities, which provided employment training and job placement for economically disadvantaged, unemployed and unskilled people of all races. In 1969, Sullivan's concept led to the formation of the Opportunities Industrialization Centers International (OICI), which would expand its services to international communities based on the "self-help" philosophy that Sullivan founded OIC upon. In 1970, Sullivan established OIC of America, Inc. to serve as a national organization that would associated with OIC affiliate campuses across the United States and provide technical assistance centers for areas where the OIC model was replicated.

Programs in Africa
Although OIC does not serve Black people exclusively, its history  as part of the civil rights protests of the 1960s  and a boycott to help desegregate white businesses in Philadelphia, was continued  in the 1970s with a Pan-African effort to help establish facilities in several African countries, "with the collective cultural capital and philanthropy raised by the people themselves in Nigeria, Ghana, Ethiopia, Kenya, and other nations".

References

Further reading

External links
 

1964 establishments in the United States
Education companies of the United States
Vocational education in the United States